
Larmor-Baden is a commune in the Morbihan department of Brittany  in northwestern France. The inhabitants of Larmor-Baden are called in French Larmoriens.

Île de Berder

Île de Berder (French for "The Island of Berder") is a small island off Larmor-Baden. In reality Berder is not a true island as it is attached to the mainland by submerged land that shows at low tide. The name Berder comes from the Breton word Breudeur, meaning brothers.

The island lies in the Gulf of Morbihan, and has a position relative to other islands:
 south of Port-Blanc
 north of île de la Jument
 west of île aux Moines
 east of île Longue and the mainland (Larmor-Baden).

See also
 Gavrinis
 Communes of the Morbihan department

References

External links

 Mayors of Morbihan Association 

Communes of Morbihan
Populated coastal places in Brittany